Tommy Grupe (born 29 March 1992) is a German professional footballer who plays for VfB Lübeck as a defender.

References

External links
 
 

1992 births
Living people
Sportspeople from Rostock
German footballers
Footballers from Mecklenburg-Western Pomerania
Association football defenders
Germany youth international footballers
2. Bundesliga players
3. Liga players
FC Hansa Rostock players
SC Preußen Münster players
VfB Lübeck players